Global Tungsten & Powders Corp. is a supplier for tungsten and molybdenum powders and specialty products. It is headquartered in Towanda, Pennsylvania and has an additional production site in Bruntál, Czech Republic.

Products
The company offers refractory metal powders and specialty products. Since 2008 Global Tungsten & Powders Corp. is a fully owned subsidiary of the Plansee Group. To ensure security of supply of raw materials, Global Tungsten & Powders Corp. has signed several long-term supply contracts with tungsten mines in the Western world and took decisive steps to expand hard and soft scrap recycling.

History
Global Tungsten & Powders Corp. began as the Patterson Screen Company in 1916, developing phosphors for the X-ray industry. Tungsten powder operations started in 1943, thermal spray powders in 1978. The processing of hard metal scrap to finished tungsten powders started 1990, soft scrap roaster were constructed 2006 and interconnect plates for solid oxide fuel cells in 2011. New markets are the energy exploration, green energy, hard materials and defense markets. Global Tungsten & Powders was purchased in 1993 by Osram.

Global Tungsten & Powders Corp. is made up of several businesses. Since 2008 it is a fully owned subsidiary of the Plansee Group with headquarters in Reutte, Austria.

Melissa Albeck was named President and CEO of Global Tungsten & Powders Corp May 1, 2021.

References

External links
Official Website
Plansee Group Website
Why Use Tungsten Carbide?

Companies based in Bradford County, Pennsylvania
Non-renewable resource companies established in 1916
American companies established in 1916
1916 establishments in Pennsylvania
Tungsten